Eurynomê (Ancient Greek: Εὐρυνόμη, from , eurys, "broad" and , nomos, "pasture" or  "law") is a name that refers to the following characters in Greek mythology:

Eurynome, pre-Olympian queen and wife of Ophion
Eurynome (Oceanid), mother of the Charites
Eurynome, one of the Cadmiades, the six daughters of Cadmus and Harmonia in a rare version of the myth. Her sisters were Ino, Agaue, Semele, Kleantho and Eurydike.
Eurynome or Eurymede, daughter of King Nisus of Megara and mother of Bellerophon by Poseidon or Glaucus.
Eurynome, mother by the Persian Orchamus of Leucothoe whom Helios loved.
Eurynome, wife of Lycurgus of Arcadia and mother of Amphidamas, Epochus, Ancaeus, and Iasus. Elsewhere is also called Cleophyle or Antinoe.
Eurynome, daughter of Iphitus and mother of Adrastus of Argos by Talaus. In some accounts, she was called the daughter of Apollo.
Eurynome, waiting woman of Penelope in the Odyssey.
Eurynome, a handmaiden of Harmonia.
Eurynome, a Lemnian woman. The goddess Pheme paid a visit to her in the guise of her friend Neaera to inform her that Eurynome's husband Codrus was being unfaithful to her with a Thracian woman.
Eurynome, an alternate name for Eidothea, the daughter of Proteus.
Eurynome, a daughter of Asopus and mother of Ogygias by Zeus, according to a late source.

See also
Eurynomos

Notes

References 

 Apollonius Rhodius, Argonautica translated by Robert Cooper Seaton (1853-1915), R. C. Loeb Classical Library Volume 001. London, William Heinemann Ltd, 1912. Online version at the Topos Text Project.
 Apollonius Rhodius, Argonautica. George W. Mooney. London. Longmans, Green. 1912. Greek text available at the Perseus Digital Library.
 Gaius Julius Hyginus, Fabulae from The Myths of Hyginus translated and edited by Mary Grant. University of Kansas Publications in Humanistic Studies. Online version at the Topos Text Project.
 Gaius Valerius Flaccus, Argonautica translated by Mozley, J H. Loeb Classical Library Volume 286. Cambridge, MA, Harvard University Press; London, William Heinemann Ltd. 1928. Online version at the Theoi Project.
 Gaius Valerius Flaccus, Argonauticon. Otto Kramer. Leipzig. Teubner. 1913. Latin text available at the Perseus Digital Library.
Hesiod, Catalogue of Women from Homeric Hymns, Epic Cycle, Homerica translated by Evelyn-White, H G. Loeb Classical Library Volume 57. London: William Heinemann, 1914. Online version at the Theoi Project.
 Nonnus of Panopolis, Dionysiaca translated by William Henry Denham Rouse (1863-1950), from the Loeb Classical Library, Cambridge, MA, Harvard University Press, 1940.  Online version at the Topos Text Project.
 Nonnus of Panopolis, Dionysiaca. 3 Vols. W.H.D. Rouse. Cambridge, MA., Harvard University Press; London, William Heinemann, Ltd. 1940-1942. Greek text available at the Perseus Digital Library.
 Pausanias, Description of Greece with an English Translation by W.H.S. Jones, Litt.D., and H.A. Ormerod, M.A., in 4 Volumes. Cambridge, MA, Harvard University Press; London, William Heinemann Ltd. 1918. . Online version at the Perseus Digital Library
 Pausanias, Graeciae Descriptio. 3 vols. Leipzig, Teubner. 1903.  Greek text available at the Perseus Digital Library.
 Pseudo-Apollodorus, The Library with an English Translation by Sir James George Frazer, F.B.A., F.R.S. in 2 Volumes, Cambridge, MA, Harvard University Press; London, William Heinemann Ltd. 1921. . Online version at the Perseus Digital Library. Greek text available from the same website.
 Pseudo-Clement, Recognitions from Ante-Nicene Library Volume 8, translated by Smith, Rev. Thomas. T. & T. Clark, Edinburgh. 1867. Online version at the Theoi Project.
 Publius Ovidius Naso, Metamorphoses translated by Brookes More (1859-1942). Boston, Cornhill Publishing Co. 1922. Online version at the Perseus Digital Library.
 Publius Ovidius Naso, Metamorphoses. Hugo Magnus. Gotha (Germany). Friedr. Andr. Perthes. 1892. Latin text available at the Perseus Digital Library.

Mortal parents of demigods in classical mythology
Mortal women of Zeus
Children of Apollo
Demigods in classical mythology
Characters in the Odyssey